Adenanthos velutinus, or velvet woollybush, is a shrub of the family Proteaceae native to Western Australia.

References

Eudicots of Western Australia
velutinus
Plants described in 1856